Dr. Plonk is a 2007 Australian silent sci-fi / comedy film written and directed by Rolf de Heer. It premiered in Australia at the 2007 Adelaide Film Festival and had live accompaniment by the Stiletto Sisters. The film was also screened at the launch of Australia's National Film and Sound Archive's new cinema, Arc, in August 2007. Its public cinema release was on 30 August 2007.

The film, set primarily in 1907, has been described as "a time-travelling satire". The Adelaide Film Festival program described it as "a black and white, silent comedy shot with a hand-cranked camera and brimming with romance, action and especially, slapstick comedy". Its score was composed by Graham Tardif. It is also notable for a cameo appearance by the South Australian Premier, Mike Rann, playing the 2007 Prime Minister.

Plot
The story focuses on Dr Plonk, a scientist and inventor who, in 1907, determines that the world will end in 101 years. However, he is ridiculed for his beliefs and so invents a time machine in order to collect evidence from the future to prove his case. But each visit he makes to 2007 only causes him more problems, and he eventually becomes a wanted man...

Cast
 Nigel Lunghi as Dr. Plonk
 Magda Szubanski as Mrs Plonk
 Paul Blackwell as Dr Plonk's assistant, Paulus
 Reg the dog as Tiberius the dog

Production
De Heer was inspired to make the film after discovering old raw film stock, which prompted him to make a silent movie.

Release
Dr. Plonk was distributed in Australia by Palace Films.

Reception

Box office
Dr. Plonk grossed $83,450 at the box office in Australia.

Critical response

Urban Cinefile Critics gave a positive review; "Beyond its novelty value, Dr Plonk is fresh and funny, wacky and outlandish as it combines slapstick, situation comedy and an audacious premise."

Accolades

Judd Overton won an award from the Australian Cinematographers Society as SA & WA Silver Award for Best Cinematography.
Additionally, Graham Tardif was nominated for a FCCA Award for Best Music Score.

See also
 Cinema of Australia
 South Australian Film Corporation

References

External links
 
 Official Palace Films Website
Adelaide Film Festival (2007) Dr Plonk

2007 films
Australian science fiction comedy films
Australian silent feature films
Films directed by Rolf de Heer
2000s science fiction comedy films
Australian black-and-white films
Films about time travel
Films set in 1907
Films set in 2007
Australian slapstick films
2007 comedy films
2000s English-language films
Silent science fiction comedy films
2000s Australian films